Deborah Myers Mathis (born 24 August 1953) is an American journalist and author. Her journalism career began as a reporter for the Arkansas Democrat, a major newspaper in Arkansas. She also worked in television news in Little Rock and Washington. She was White House correspondent for the Gannett News Service. She returned to Arkansas and newspaper journalism at the Arkansas Gazette as an editorial columnist and associate editor.

Early life and education
Mathis was born in Little Rock, Arkansas on August 24, 1953, to Rev. Lloyd H. Myers and Rachel A. Helms Myers. She attended Gibbs Elementary, Rightsell Elementary, Westside Junior High, and Little Rock Central High School, where she was the first black and first female editor of the school's newspaper. She studied journalism at the University of Arkansas.

Career
In 1973, Mathis became a reporter for Channel 11 Dateline News. Her career includes work as a reporter for the Arkansas Democrat and the Arkansas Gazette (now merged into the Arkansas Democrat-Gazette), and TV stations KARK-Channel 4 and KATV-Channel 7. She was also a columnist for the Arkansas Gazette, and the first Black member of the Arkansas Gazette editorial board. From 1993 to 2000 she was the White House correspondent for Gannett. In 2000, she was selected as a Fall Fellow at the Shorenstein Center on the Press, Politics and Public Policy at the Kennedy School of Government to examine the role of race in press coverage in a case study.

Mathis is a regular commentator on America's Black Forum and a nationally syndicated columnist for Tribune Media Services. She has also appeared as a commentator on NPR.

Mathis is an assistant professor at Northwestern University's Medill School of Journalism.

Works

Honors and awards
 2003, inducted into the Arkansas Black Hall of Fame

Personal life
Mathis lives with her husband and children in Chevy Chase, Maryland.

References

External links

1953 births
Living people
American women journalists
African-American women writers
African-American writers
Writers from Little Rock, Arkansas
People from Chevy Chase, Maryland
21st-century African-American people
21st-century African-American women
20th-century African-American people
20th-century African-American women